Laterality: Asymmetries of Body, Brain and Cognition is a bimonthly peer-reviewed academic journal covering the study of laterality, and related behavioral and neurological factors, in human and non-human species. It was established in 1996, with Michael Corballis (University of Auckland), Chris McManus (University College London), and Phil Bryden (University of Waterloo) as founding editors-in-chief. Michael Peters (University of Guelph) served as editor after Bryden's death in 1996. Mike Nicholls (Flinders University) and Giorgio Vallortigara (University of Trento) replaced Corballis and Peters in 2007 after McManus retired and continued as editors-in-chief until 2018. The current editors-in-chief are Gina Grimshaw (Victoria University of Wellington), Markus Hausman (Durham University), and Lesley Rogers (University of New England, Australia).

References

External links

Taylor & Francis academic journals
Bimonthly journals
Neuropsychology journals
Publications established in 1996
English-language journals